The 1966 Lunar Orbiter 2 robotic spacecraft mission, part of the Lunar Orbiter Program, was designed primarily to photograph smooth areas of the lunar surface for selection and verification of safe landing sites for the Surveyor and Apollo missions. It was also equipped to collect selenodetic, radiation intensity, and micrometeoroid impact data.

Mission summary
The spacecraft was placed in a cislunar trajectory and injected into an elliptical near-equatorial lunar orbit for data acquisition after 92.6 hours' flight time. The perilune was lowered to  five days later after 33 orbits. A failure of the amplifier on the final day of readout, December 7, resulted in the loss of six photographs. On December 8, 1966 the inclination was altered to 17.5 degrees to provide new data on lunar gravity.

The spacecraft acquired photographic data from November 18 to 25, 1966, and readout occurred through December 7, 1966. These included a spectacular oblique picture of Copernicus crater, which was dubbed by the news media as one of the great pictures of the century. The photo was taken on the 23rd November at an altitude of 45km. Accurate data were acquired from all other experiments throughout the mission. Three micrometeorite impacts were recorded. The spacecraft was used for tracking purposes until it impacted upon the lunar surface on command at 3.0 degrees N latitude, 119.1 degrees E longitude (selenographic coordinates) on October 11, 1967.

In 2011, NASA's Lunar Reconnaissance Orbiter Camera (LROC) was able to locate and image the precise impact point of the spacecraft. The debris from an impact angle of 45 degrees or more spreads out like butterfly wings.

See also

 Lunar Orbiter Image Recovery Project
 Exploration of the Moon
 Lunar Orbiter 1
 Lunar Orbiter 3
 Lunar Orbiter 4
 Lunar Orbiter 5
 List of artificial objects on the Moon

References

2
Spacecraft launched in 1966
Spacecraft that orbited the Moon
Spacecraft that impacted the Moon
1967 on the Moon